Frische teutsche Liedlein is a five-part collection of songs, which was written and published in 1539-1556 by the doctor, composer and song collector Georg Forster  (around 1510 in Amberg – 12 November 1568 in Nuremberg). It comprises 380 polyphonic, predominantly secular German songs. The collection later received its collective name. It is the most extensive and important song publication of the time and one of the most important sources for tenor singers (with the cantus firmus in the tenor, such as a version of Innsbruck, ich muss dich lassen by Heinrich Isaac and Mir ist ein rot Goldfingerlein by Ludwig Senfl).

Volumes 
 Ein außzug guter alter und newer Teutscher liedlein/einer rechten Teutschen art/auff allerley Instrumenten zubrauchen/außerlesen. Nürnberg 1539(2nd edition 1543; 3rd edition 1549 [title modified]; 4th edition 1552 [title modified]; 5th edition 1560/61)
 Der ander theyl kurtzweiliger guter frischer Teutscher Liedlein zu singen vast lustig. Nürnberg 1540(2nd edition 1549 [title modified]; 3rd edition 1553; 4th edition 1565)
 Der dritte theyl schöner lieblicher alter und newer Teutscher Liedlein, nicht alleine zu singen sondern auch auff allerley Instrumenten zu brauchen … und vormals nie gesehen. Nürnberg 1549(2nd edition 1552 [title modified]; 3rd edition 1563)
 Der vierdt theyl schöner frölicher frischer alter und newer Teutscher Liedlein mit vier stimmen nicht allein zu singen sondern auch auff allen Instrumenten zu brauchen. Nürnberg 1556
 Der fünfft theyl schöner alter und newer Teutscher liedlein mit fünff stimmen nicht allein zu singen sondern auch auff allen Instrumenten zu brauchen. Nürnberg 1556

Selection of well-known songs from the collection 
 Drei Laub auf einer Linden
 Entlaubet ist der Walde (Thomas Stoltzer)
 Es liegt ein Schloß in Österreich (Caspar Othmayr)
 Es wollt ein Jäger jagen
 Im Mayen, im Mayen
 Innsbruck, ich muß dich lassen (Heinrich Isaac)
 Mir ist ein feins brauns Maidelein (Caspar Othmayr)
 Vergangen ist mir Glück und Heil
 Wie schön blüht uns der Maien (Caspar Othmayr)
 Wir zogen in das Feld
 Wo soll ich mich hinkehren
 Wohl auf, gut Gsell, von hinnen (Caspar Othmayr)

Editions 
 Kurt Gudewill et al. (ed.): Georg Forster: Frische teutsche Liedlein (1539–1556). ( Volume 20; 60–63). Möseler, Wolfenbüttel 1964–1997.
 M. Elizabeth Marriage (ed.): Georg Forsters Frische Teutsche Liedlein in fünf Teilen. Niemeyer, Halle 1903.

Literature

External links 

 Digitalisat der vier Stimmbücher des 1. Teils (signature: München, Bayerische Staatsbibliothek – 4 Mus.pr. 167)
 

Song books
16th-century German literature